The Great Peacemaker (Skén:nen rahá:wi [skʌ̃.nːʌ̃.ɾahaːwi] in Mohawk), sometimes referred to as Deganawida or Tekanawí:ta (as a mark of respect, some Iroquois avoid using his personal name except in special circumstances) was by tradition, along with Jigonhsasee and Hiawatha, the founder of the Haudenosaunee, commonly called the Iroquois Confederacy. This is a political and cultural union of six Iroquoian-speaking Native American tribes residing in the present-day state of New York, northern Pennsylvania, and the eastern portion of the province of Ontario, Canada. The traditional stories and legends about Skennenrahawi (also known as the Great Peacemaker) do not provide a specific date or year for when he lived but Haudenosaunee tradition indicates 200AD - 300AD in lodge teachings. However, it is generally believed that he lived several centuries ago, likely in the pre-contact era of North American history when the Haudenosaunee (Iroquois) Confederacy was formed. The exact dates and historical details of this time period are often the subjects of ongoing research and debate among scholars and historians.

Background
The Great Peacemaker's name means "Two River Currents Flowing Together". Some of the numerous legends about the Great Peacemaker have conflicting information.  It is reported that he was born a Huron, and by some accounts, his mother was a virgin, According to Haudenosaunee (Iroquois) oral tradition, the mother of the Great Peacemaker Skennenrahawi was a woman named Jigonhsasee (also spelled Jigonsaseh, Jigonsasee, or Jigonhsasay). She is known as the "Mother of Nations" because she played a key role in the founding of the Haudenosaunee Confederacy, which brought together five distinct nations (Mohawk, Oneida, Onondaga, Cayuga, and Seneca) into a unified political and cultural entity. Jigonhsasee is honored as a powerful and respected leader in Haudenosaunee culture and her legacy is celebrated in many ceremonies and traditions, making the birth miraculous. According to some versions of the story, Jigonhsasee was visited by a messenger from the spirit world who informed her that she was to give birth to a child who would bring peace and unity to the Haudenosaunee people. According to tradition, His message was 2-fold 1. There is but ONE God and no other besides that God, that he was not to be worshipped but a Messenger of the One Creator of all. 2. Mankind was to live in symmetry with creation as the pinnacle creation of The One God. However, the details of this visit and the identity of the messenger may vary depending on the specific version of the story being told. It is worth noting that the story of Skennenrahawi's birth is part of a rich and complex oral tradition that has been passed down through generations of Haudenosaunee people and may vary in its details and interpretations.  Others say he was born an Onondaga and later adopted by the Mohawk.

Haudenosaunee confederacy 

By all accounts, the Great Peacemaker was a prophet who counseled peace among the warring tribes. According to some legends his first ally was Jigonhsasee, who became known as the Mother of Nations. She lent her home for the meeting of the leaders of the rival tribal nations. The Great Peacemaker's follower Hiawatha, an Onondaga renowned for his oratory, helped him achieve his vision of bringing the tribes together in peace.

According to the archaeologist Dean Snow, the Great Peacemaker converted Hiawatha in the territory of the Onondaga; he traveled alone to visit the Mohawk tribe who lived near what is now Cohoes, New York. Other traditional accounts hold that the Great Peacemaker consulted with Jigonhsasee about which tribal leaders to approach and she facilitated that meeting to create the confederacy.

According to some legends, initially the Mohawk rejected the message of the Great Peacemaker, so he decided to perform a feat to demonstrate his purity and spiritual power.  After climbing a tree high above Kahon:ios (Cohoes Falls), the Great Peacemaker told the Mohawk warriors to chop the tree down.  Many onlookers watched as the Great Peacemaker disappeared into the swirling rapids of the Mohawk River.  They believed he had died but the next morning they found him sitting near a campfire.  Greatly impressed by the Great Peacemaker's miraculous survival, the Mohawk became the founding tribe of the Iroquois Confederacy. The tribes gathered at Onondaga Lake, where they planted a Tree of Peace and proclaimed the Great Binding Law of the Iroquois Confederacy.

The Mackinac natives record that Hiawatha came to Mackinaw Island to see Giche Mantitou Rock, also known as "Sugarloaf Rock",  where Peacemaker taught as well references that Peacemaker walked upon Lake Ontario. According to Haudenosaunee (Iroquois) oral tradition, Skennenrahawi (also known as the Great Peacemaker) left the Haudenosaunee people after they had accepted the Great Law of Peace and established the Iroquois Confederacy. It is said that he departed on a white stone canoe that carried him across Lake Ontario to the land of the Huron people.

Different versions of the story suggest that Skennenrahawi went to different places after leaving the Haudenosaunee. Some traditions hold that he traveled to other Indigenous nations to share his teachings and promote peace, while others say that he returned to the spirit world or ascended to the heavens. It is worth noting that the story of Skennenrahawi's departure and ultimate fate is part of a rich oral tradition that has been passed down through generations of Haudenosaunee people and may vary in its details and interpretations. It is additionally recorded by them that Peacemaker's canoe could fly including a story where Peacemaker stated to Hiawatha, "this canoe can be rowed across these waters or do you want it to see it fly across". He traveled through the narrow neck of land near Niagara Falls healing the sick and all that he touched.

Dates
The dates Dekanawida lived, and thus the founding of the Confederacy, have not been identified with certainty.

Historians and archeologists have researched an incident related in the oral history of the founding of the Confederacy. As recorded by later scholars, one account relates there was a violent conflict among the Seneca, who were the last Iroquois nation to join the confederacy as a founding member. Their violence stopped when the sun darkened and the day seemed to turn to night. Since 1902 scholars have studied the possibility that this event was a solar eclipse, as William Canfield suggested in his Legends of the Iroquois; told by "the Cornplanter" . As scholars have learned more about the representation of natural events in oral histories, scholars into the 21st century have noted eclipses that could serve to date the founding of the Confederacy, in addition to the archeological evidence. Scholars referring to an eclipse have included (chronologically): Paul A. W. Wallace, Elizabeth Tooker, Bruce E. Johansen, Dean R. Snow, Barbara A. Mann and Jerry L. Fields, William N. Fenton, David Henige, Gary Warrick, and Neta Crawford.

Since Canfield's first mention, and the majority view, scholars have widely supported a date of 1451 AD as being of a known solar eclipse and the likely founding date based on this oral account and other evidence. Some argue it is an insufficient fit for the description, and favor a date of 1142, when there was also a documented solar eclipse. A few question dating the founding of the confederacy based on the mention of the eclipse.

Archeological investigation has contributed to discussions about the founding date, as its evidence can be dated and correlated to natural events. In 1982 archeologist Dean Snow said that evidence from mainstream archeology did not support a founding of the confederacy for any dates of an eclipse before 1350 AD (thus ruling out the 1142 AD date.) By 1998 Fenton considered an eclipse earlier than the 1451 AD majority view unlikely, but possible as long as it was after 1000 AD. By 2007/8 reviews considered an 1142 AD eclipse as a possible point of reference, even if most scholars supported 1451 AD as the safe choice.

Influence on the United States constitution
This confederacy influenced the United States Constitution and Anglo-American ideas of democracy, as recognized by Concurrent Resolution 331 issued by the U. S. Congress in 1988, which states in part:Whereas the original framers of the Constitution, including, most notably, George Washington and Benjamin Franklin, are known to have greatly admired the concepts of the Six Nations of the Iroquois Confederacy; Whereas the confederation of the original Thirteen Colonies into one republic was influenced by the political system developed by the Iroquois Confederacy as were many of the democratic principles which were incorporated into the Constitution itself

Iroquois dominance
The Great Peacemaker established a council of clan and village chiefs to govern the confederacy.  In each tribe, which had matrilineal kinship systems of descent and property-holding, power was shared between the sexes.  Men held the positions of hereditary chiefs through their mother's line; clan mothers ruled on the fitness of chiefs and could depose any that they opposed. Most decisions in council were made by consensus, to which each representative had an equal voice. Early anthropologist Lewis H. Morgan attributed the regional dominance achieved by the Iroquois to their superior organization and coordination compared to other tribes; George Hunt also thought there was a factor of economic determinism, with their need for furs for the European trade and their superior geographic position controlling most of central and western New York. The oral laws and customs of the Great Law of Peace became the constitution of the Iroquois Confederacy, established by the 16th century or earlier.

Prophecy of the Boy Seer
The Great Peacemaker worked all his life to bring his vision to fruition.  He prophesied that a "white serpent" would come to his people's lands and make friends with them, only to deceive them later.  A "red serpent" would later make war against the "white serpent", but a Native American boy would be given a great power.  He would be accepted as a chosen leader by the people of "the land of the hilly country."  The boy stays neutral in the fight, and he speaks to the people, who number as the blades of grass, but he is heard by all. After a season, a "black serpent" would come and defeat both the "white" and "red serpents".  According to the prophecy, when the people gathered under the elm tree become humble, all three "serpents" would be blinded by a light many times brighter than the sun. Deganawidah said that he would be that light.  His nation would accept the "white serpent" into their safekeeping like a long-lost brother.

In the Baháʼí Faith

Some members of the Baháʼí Faith have connected the signs of a Prophet, as described by Bahá'u'lláh (Prophet-founder of the Baháʼí Faith), with the Peacemaker. As such, many Native American Baháʼís in North America (and some non-Native) revere the Peacemaker as a Manifestation of God.

In film
Kissed by Lightning, 2009 film by Shelley Niro

See also
 List of peace activists

References

Further reading
The Quarterly Journal of the New York State Historical Association 1926  

Gibson, John Arthur (1992). "Concerning the League: the Iroquois League as Dictated in Onondaga", newly elicited, edited and translated by Hanni Woodbury in collaboration with Reg Henry and Harry Webster on the basis of A.A. *Goldenweiser's Manuscript. Memoir 9 (Algonquian and Iroquoian Linguistics, Winnipeg).
Henry, Thomas R. (1955). Wilderness Messiah: the story of Hiawatha and the Iroquois. Bonanza Books, New York. .
Mann, Charles C (2005). 1491 New Revelations of the Americas Before Columbus, Alfred A. Knopf, New York.  .
Sidis, W.J. (1982). The Tribes and the States. Wampanoag Nation.
Snow, Dean R. (2008). Archaeology of Native North America, New York: Prentice Hall.

External links
"Deganawidah" Infoplease, University of Liverpool
"Great Law of Peace", Six Nations.org
 
 The Great Peacemaker Deganawidah and his follower Hiawatha Theater play by Living Wisdom School

Iroquois people
Native American leaders
Indigenous leaders in Ontario
Religious figures of the indigenous peoples of North America
National founders
12th-century North American people
Founders of religions
Prophets